Luís Domingues is a Brazilian municipality in the state of Maranhão. Its population is 6,984 (2020) and its area is 464 km2.

References

Populated coastal places in Maranhão
Municipalities in Maranhão